The word Muskingum derives from a similarly sounding Delaware (Native American) word, which some claim to translate as 'Eye of the Elk.'
Muskingum may refer to:
 Muskingum (village), an 18-century Native American community
 Muskingum University
 Muskingum County, Ohio
 Muskingum County Speedway
 Muskingum River
 Muskingum Island, an island in the Ohio River
 Muskingum Township, Ohio (disambiguation) (2 different townships)